William Edmondson was an English professional association footballer who played as a winger. He played two matches in the Football League for Burnley in the 1902–03 season.

References

Year of birth unknown
Year of death missing
English footballers
Association football wingers
Burnley F.C. players
English Football League players